On the Run was a concert tour by English singer-songwriter Paul McCartney. The tour began on 15 July 2011, with McCartney's first two concerts at Yankee Stadium in New York City. McCartney's appearances at Yankee Stadium occurred nearly two years to the day after his 17, 18, and 21 July 2009 concerts at Citi Field, documented on the Good Evening New York City CD/DVD.

Background
The tour was promoted by AEG Live, and six of the eight shows in the first leg (with the exception of the Yankee Stadium shows) were presented by HP. The Mexican concerts were promoted by Nextel. In an interview with Billboard in February 2012, McCartney said of his tour band: "Aren't they cool? We're having a really great time, and last year we played quite a few dates. They're such a pleasure to play with. We all enjoy each other's company and the musicianship, and next month we will have been playing together 10 years. That's long enough to make us a proper band."

In North America

In response to overwhelming popular demand for tickets to McCartney's 15 July Yankee Stadium debut, a second date was added for Saturday, 16 July. McCartney also performed on three more dates on the tour: 24 July at Comerica Park in Detroit, Michigan, 31 July at Wrigley Field in Chicago, Illinois, and 4 August at The Great American Ball Park in Cincinnati, Ohio. McCartney's Detroit, Chicago and Cincinnati stadium gigs were hugely anticipated returns to cities with that have hosted historical performances in the past: The 24 July Comerica Park and 31 July Wrigley Field shows were his first visits to the Detroit area and Chicago since 2005 (McCartney has not performed within Detroit City limits since 1976 during the Wings Over America Tour), while the 4 August Great American Ball Park was his first Cincinnati appearance in 18 years, his last show in the city being on The New World Tour in 1993.

In Latin America
In Montevideo, Uruguay all tickets were sold-out in about 40 minutes. On 15 April, McCartney performed for over a 54,000 sold-out crowd in the Estadio Centenario for the first time in Uruguay. The artist also visited Asunción, Paraguay for the first time in his career. In the Defensores del Chaco stadium he gave a show for more than 30,000 fans (29,000 sold tickets). He claimed after the show in his website that "he will never forget the lively Paraguayan crowd". On 27 March, 29,000 tickets for McCartney's 19 April first ever show in Colombia became available; 24 hours later 90% of the tickets were already sold. Days before the concert 2,000 extra tickets became available and sold-out in a couple of days. Hours before McCartney performed for the very first time in Colombia, less than 900 tickets had not been sold, which made the concert a sold-out show. Paul performed for a 32,000 crowd at the Stadium El Campin for more than two hours and a half and declared that the audience in the show where possibly the best one he have had during all his career. For the first time in 19 years, McCartney performed the song "Hope of Deliverance" in Bogotá, Colombia, on 19 April, being it the very first time that he performed a song from Off the Ground album with his current line-up.

Paul McCartney performed on 5 May 2012 at Omnilife Stadium at Guadalajara, Jalisco, Mexico, his first concert in that city. For the first time, on 8 May 2012, he performed at Estadio Azteca, stating he was in front of "the loudest crowd ever", and he finished his tour in Mexico with a free show at Zócalo; for this last one, attendance was estimated to be around 250,000 people, making it the biggest audience since the Kiev (350,000) and Quebec (250,000) shows.

Tour band

Tour dates

Setlist

Instruments played by band members

See also
 List of Paul McCartney concert tours

Notes

References

External links
 

2011 concert tours
2012 concert tours
Paul McCartney concert tours